This article displays the qualifying draw of the 2011 Aegon International.

Players

Seeds

  Elena Vesnina (second round)
  Ayumi Morita (first round)
  Anabel Medina Garrigues (qualifying competition)
  Gréta Arn (second round, withdrew)
  Vera Dushevina (first round)
  Bojana Jovanovski (qualified)
  Sania Mirza (qualifying competition)
  Alizé Cornet (first round)

Qualifiers

  Mirjana Lučić
  Zheng Jie
  Bojana Jovanovski
  Tamira Paszek

Qualifying draw

First qualifier

Second qualifier

Third qualifier

Fourth qualifier

References
 Qualifying Draw

Qualifying
Aegon International - qualifying